Foster is a town in Garvin County, Oklahoma, United States. It was incorporated in 2002 and had a population of 161 at the 2010 census.

Foster is served by State Highway 29A, a spur of State Highway 29. A post office was first established at Foster on August 12, 1891.

Cemetery

Geography
Foster is located in southwestern Garvin County at  (34.6164698, -97.4891933). State Highway 29 follows the northern border of the town, leading east  to Elmore City and west  to Bray. State Highway 76 passes through the western part of the town, leading north  to Lindsay and south  to Ratliff City.

Demographics

References

Towns in Oklahoma
Towns in Garvin County, Oklahoma